Buly Da Conceição Triste (born July 4, 1991) is a sprint canoeist from São Tomé and Príncipe. He competed at the 2016 Summer Olympics in the men's C-1 1000 metres event; his time of 4:46.396 in the semifinals did not qualify him for the finals. He was the flag bearer for São Tomé and Príncipe at the Parade of Nations.

He won a gold, a silver and a bronze medal at the 2019 African Games.

He competed at the 2020 Summer Olympics.

References

External links 
 

1991 births
Living people
São Tomé and Príncipe male canoeists
Olympic canoeists of São Tomé and Príncipe
Canoeists at the 2016 Summer Olympics
African Games medalists in canoeing
African Games gold medalists for São Tomé and Príncipe
African Games silver medalists for São Tomé and Príncipe
African Games bronze medalists for São Tomé and Príncipe
Competitors at the 2019 African Games
Canoeists at the 2020 Summer Olympics